Charlestown Township is one of twelve townships in Clark County, Indiana. As of the 2010 census, its population was 13,450 and it contained 5,382 housing units.

History
Charlestown Township was organized in 1817.

Geography

Cities and towns
 Charlestown

Unincorporated towns
 Otisco
 Rolling Hills
 Springville (extinct)

Adjacent townships
 Oregon Township (north)
 Owen Township (east)
 Utica Township (south)
 Silver Creek Township (southwest)
 Union Township (west)
 Monroe Township (northwest)

Major highways
  Indiana State Road 3
  Indiana State Road 62
  Indiana State Road 160
  Indiana State Road 403

Cemeteries
The township contains several cemeteries: Armstrong Cemetery, Baird Cemetery (a.k.a. King), Bottorff, Caldwell (a.k.a. Lutz/Prather), Carter, Charlestown, Coble, County Poor Farm, Crace, Douglas, Faris, Fifty-four, Goodwin, Goodwin/Nicholson, Hammond, Hester-Rowland, Kessler (a.k.a. Faris II), Long, Mathes, McCormick (a.k.a. McCullough), McDonald, Meloy, Montgomery, Otisco Cemetery (a.k.a. Seedtick), Pleasant Grove, Robertson, Robinson, Salem Methodist Church, Shelby Cemetery, Silver Creek Cemetery, St. Michael's, James Stuart Plantation, Weimer, and Worrell/Worrall.

References
 
 United States Census Bureau cartographic boundary files

External links
 Indiana Township Association
 United Township Association of Indiana

Townships in Clark County, Indiana
Townships in Indiana
Populated places established in 1817
1817 establishments in Indiana